Crenicichla cyclostoma is a species of cichlid native to South America. It is found in the Amazon River basin and in the lower Tocantins River basin.

References

cyclostoma
Fish of the Amazon basin
Taxa named by Alex Ploeg
Fish described in 1991